8-Cyclopentyl-1,3-dimethylxanthine (8-Cyclopentyltheophylline, 8-CPT, CPX) is a drug which acts as a potent and selective antagonist for the adenosine receptors, with some selectivity for the A1 receptor subtype, as well as a non-selective phosphodiesterase inhibitor. It has stimulant effects in animals with slightly higher potency than caffeine.

See also 
 8-Chlorotheophylline
 8-Phenyltheophylline
 DMPX
 DPCPX
 Xanthine

References 

Adenosine receptor antagonists
Phosphodiesterase inhibitors
Xanthines
Cyclopentyl compounds